Daniel Vlăduț Zaharia (born 12 January 1995) is a Romanian rugby union player who plays as a wing for professional SuperLiga club Timișoara Saracens.

Club career
Vlăduț Zaharia started playing rugby as a youth for CSS Bârlad then moved to the seniors team RC Bârlad. In 2015 he was signed by Timișoara Saracens.

International career
In November 2018, he was called for Romania's national team, the Oaks, being part of the 34 man squad assembled in preparation for a match against the Os Lobos held for the Relegation/Promotion Play-Off of the 2018 Rugby Europe Championship, making his test debut on this occasion.

References

External links

 Vlăduț Zaharia at Timișoara Saracens website (in Romanian)

1995 births
Living people
Romanian rugby union players
Romania international rugby union players
SCM Rugby Timișoara players
Rugby union wings
Sportspeople from Bârlad